Martin Aloysius Cunningham (1903-1979), was a rugby league footballer in the New South Wales Rugby League (NSWRL)- Australia's major rugby league competition.

Playing career
Cunningham began his career playing with the University club in 1922. He played 52 matches for that club in the years 1922–23 and 1926–28.

A Winger, Cunningham was a member of University’s most successful side that was beaten in the 1926 premiership decider by South Sydney.

Between his stints at the University club Cunningham had two seasons at the Eastern Suburbs club playing in 9 matches and is recognised as that club's 145th player.

Death
He died at Tamworth, New South Wales on 19 Nov 1979.

References

Sources
 The Encyclopedia of Rugby League, Alan Whiticker and Glen Hudson
 History Of The New South Wales Rugby League Finals, Steve Hadden

1903 births
Australian rugby league players
Sydney Roosters players
1979 deaths
Sydney University rugby league team players
Rugby league five-eighths
Rugby league centres
Rugby league wingers